Oligoneurina is a genus of moths in the family Gracillariidae.

Species
Oligoneurina ficicola Vári, 1961

External links
Global Taxonomic Database of Gracillariidae (Lepidoptera)

Gracillariinae
Gracillarioidea genera